The Festival Luxembourgeois du cyclisme féminin Elsy Jacobs formerly known as the Grand Prix Elsy Jacobs is an international women's road bicycle race held in Garnich, Luxembourg. Since 2008 this event is on the UCI women's elite cycle racing calendar. Between 2009 and 2011 it was rated as an UCI 1.1 category race and since 2012 the race is a 2.1 category stage race.

The race is named after Elsy Jacobs, the first winner of the UCI Road World Championships – Women's road race, which took place at Reims, France in 1958 and Hour record holder from 1958 to 1972.

Winners

External links 
 

Recurring sporting events established in 2008
Women's road bicycle races
Cycle races in Luxembourg
2008 establishments in Luxembourg
Spring (season) events in Luxembourg